The 1962 Sandown International Cup was a motor race for Formula Libre cars,  staged at Sandown Park, in Victoria, Australia on 12 March 1962. The race was contested over 60 laps, a total distance of 120 miles (193 km).
It was the feature race at the opening meeting of the Sandown Park circuit.

The race was won by Jack Brabham driving a Cooper T55 Coventry Climax.

Results

References

External links
 Images of "Open Wheelers 1962" at autopics.com.au

Sandown International Cup
Motorsport at Sandown